Christian Lantuéjoul (born 1950) is a French mathematician. Lantuéjoul was selected to receive Georges Matheron Lectureship Award – 2018 from the International Association for Mathematical Geosciences. Lantuéjoul serves as Director of Research at School of Mines ParisTech.

Education
PhD School of Mines, Nancy

Selected book
Christian Lantuéjoul, Geostatistical Simulation. Models and Algorithms (2002), Springer-Verlag, 256 pages

References

Living people
1950 births
Place of birth missing (living people)
French mathematicians
Georges Matheron Lectureship recipients
Academic staff of Mines Paris - PSL